Route 173 (Route-du-Président-Kennedy) is a major north/south highway on the south shore of the St. Lawrence River in Quebec, Canada, named after the assassinated American president, John F. Kennedy. Its southern terminus is at the Armstrong-Jackman Border Crossing in  Saint-Théophile in the hamlet of Armstrong, at the border with Maine (U.S. Route 201 / Maine SR 6), and its northern terminus is in Lévis at the junction of Route 132. Route 173 follows the Chaudière River for most of its course, from Saint-Georges, down to Scott, where the route takes a more northeastern route towards Lévis, crossing the Etchemin River in the municipality of Saint-Henri-de-Lévis.

Municipalities along Route 173

 Saint-Côme-Linière
 Saint-Georges
 Notre-Dame-des-Pins
 Beauceville
 Saint-Joseph-de-Beauce
 Vallée-Jonction
 Sainte-Marie
 Scott
 Saint-Isidore
 Saint-Henri-de-Levis
 Pintendre
 Lévis

See also
List of Quebec provincial highways
List of buildings and monuments honoring presidents of the United States in other countries

References

External links 
 Provincial Route Map (Courtesy of the Quebec Ministry of Transportation) 
 Route 173 on Google Maps

173